The Case of the Dirty Bird is the first novel in the Culpepper Adventures series by Gary Paulsen. It is about Dunc Culpepper and best friend, Amos who with the help of a 150-year-old parrot manage to uncover a ring of appliance thieves and escape a watchdog to discover who stole an antique doll. It was published on June 1, 1992 by Dell Publishing.

Novels by Gary Paulsen
1992 American novels